Colin Mark Wells (born 3 March 1960) is a former cricketer. He was a solid county all-rounder, who played for Derbyshire and Sussex, as well as Border and Western Province in South Africa.

He played two One Day Internationals in 1985, without making much of an impact, and was never selected to play for England again.

He is the brother of Alan Wells, who played a single Test and ODI in 1995.

He coached and captained Seaford Cricket Club for the 2006 and 2007 season and was the coach of the United Arab Emirates national side in 2009.

References

External links
 

English cricketers
England One Day International cricketers
Derbyshire cricketers
Western Province cricketers
Sussex cricketers
Border cricketers
English cricket coaches
1960 births
Living people
Coaches of the United Arab Emirates national cricket team
Marylebone Cricket Club cricketers